Pavel Kelemen (born 28 May 1991, in Domažlice) is a Czech racing cyclist who currently rides for UCI Continental team .

In 2011 Pavel Kelemen was part of the Czech team sprint team at the European Championships in Apeldoorn, together with Denis Špička and Filip Ditzel.  The team finished in 8th.

In 2012, Kelemen was nominated by his federation to take part in the London Olympics for the Men's sprint competition. He competed in the same event at the 2016 Summer Olympics, alongside the men's keirin event.

In 2015, he won the men's keirin event at the European Track Cycling Championships.

References

External links
 
 
 
 
 
 

1991 births
Living people
Czech male cyclists
Czech track cyclists
Olympic cyclists of the Czech Republic
Cyclists at the 2012 Summer Olympics
Cyclists at the 2016 Summer Olympics
European Games competitors for the Czech Republic
Cyclists at the 2019 European Games
People from Domažlice
Sportspeople from the Plzeň Region